Yongling, Yong Ling or Yong Mausoleum (永陵) may refer to:

Yongling (Former Shu), the tomb of Wang Jian (847–918) in Chengdu, Sichuan, China
Yongling (Ming dynasty), the tomb of the Jiajing Emperor (1507–1567) in Beijing
Yongling (Qing dynasty), the tomb of descendants of Fuman in Liaoning, China
Yongling (Shaanxi), a historical site in Shaanxi

See also
Ling Yong (born 1978), Chinese Paralympic athlete